Mir-Hossein Mousavi Khameneh (In Persian: میرحسین موسوی خامنه) served as the last Prime Minister of Iran, from 1981 to 1989, before the position of Prime Minister was abolished in the 1989's review of the Iranian constitution. Just before the Islamic Revolution, he and his wife, Zahra Rahnavard moved to the United States of America and came back to Iran right after the establishment of the Islamic Republic of Iran. After they had been admitted to the structure of the government, two of the proponents of the Islamic Republic of Iran, namely, Hassan Ayat [Ph.D. holder] and Abdolhamid Diyalameh [Ph.D. holder and an MP] went to their lengths to remove Mousavi and Rahnavard from the political structure of the government but both were suspiciously martyred. After 20 years of absence from the political scene of Iran, on March 9, 2009 he announced his candidacy in the 2009 Iranian Presidential election.

Past elections
Mousavi refused to run for President in the 1997 Presidential election, which caused the reformists to turn to Mohammad Khatami, who won a landslide victory. Mousavi's wife, Zahra Rahnavard, explained in an interview that the reason for her husband not running in the 1997 election had been receiving discouraging messages from "the higher officials", a hint possibly at the Supreme Leader Ali Khamenei and/or the then President Akbar Hashemi Rafsanjani.

Mousavi was considered as one of the possible candidates of the reformist alliance to run in the Iranian Presidential election, 2005. However he officially turned down the invitation of a number of parties in the reformist alliance on October 12, 2004, after a meeting with President Mohammad Khatami and the two other high-ranking members of the Association of Combatant Clerics, Mehdi Karroubi and Mohammad Mousavi-Khoiniha.

Campaign news

Platform
Mousavi ran as an independent Principled Reformist candidate. Although he is one of the original founders of the Iranian reformist camp, he shares many principles of the conservatives. Many reformist parties, among them reformist Islamic Iranian Participation Front, whose main candidate was Khatami, have supported his candidacy after the latter withdrew from the race. Many supporters of the reformist movement have however objected to Mousavi's candidacy on the grounds that he is not committed to the principles of the reformist parties. Although Mousavi stated that he was not running as a reformist, he indicated that he welcomed the support of different parties, both reformist and conservative. He started his campaign from the center of the Iranian politics, however over time he shifted more towards the reformist camp by declaring his support for reforms. Although some active members of the conservative camp, such as Emad Afroogh, as well as the conservative newspaper Jomhouri Eslami, supported Mousavi's candidacy, he did not receive the official backing of any major conservative party. His candidacy made it harder for the conservatives to support Mahmoud Ahmadinejad, and large conservative parties, such as the Combatant Clergy Association, did not back the current President for the second term of office.

The BBC reported that Mousavi "called for greater personal freedoms in Iran and criticised the ban on private television channels", but "refused to back down from the country's disputed nuclear programme, saying it is "for peaceful purposes".

On May 30, Mousavi pledged that if elected he would amend "discriminatory and unjust regulations" against women, and take other measures in favour of women's rights and equality.

Iran blocks Facebook

On May 23, 2009, the Iranian government blocked access to Facebook across the country but lifted the blockage after protests from the public. Gulfnews.com reported that the former move had been a response to the use of Facebook by the candidates running against the incumbent Mr Ahmadinejad; Mousavi has great support by those using social networking sites such as Facebook. PC World reported that Mousavi's Facebook page had more than 6,600 supporters at the time of the writing of the article.

Endorsements

Election

According to official results, Mousavi lost the 2009 election. However, accusations of fraud were widespread and the announcement of the results lead to widespread protests. These protest were suppressed by the Iranian government.

References

External links

Kalemeh News
Ghalam News
Mir Hussein Mousavi
Setad e Ma - ستاد ما
Setad e Man
 Vote for Change - Vote for Mir Hossein Mousavi, a promotional video by a number of Iranian motion-picture celebrities, including Dariush Mehrjoui, Kiumars Pourahmad, Manijeh Hekmat, Masoud Kimiai and Mohsen Makhmalbaf: YouTube (9 min 54 sec).
 "The changing face of Iranian politics", BBC video, June 7, 2009 (on the prospect of Mousavi's election)
Mousavi's Program booklet, first version

Election campaigns in Iran
2009 Iranian presidential election
Articles containing video clips